Rodburn is an unincorporated community in Rowan County, in the U.S. state of Kentucky.

History
Rodburn had its start in the 1870s when the Hixson-Rodburn Lumber Company built a sawmill there. A post office was established at Rodburn in 1888, and remained in operation until 1922.

References

Unincorporated communities in Rowan County, Kentucky
Unincorporated communities in Kentucky